Nikola Markoski (born 22 May 1990) is a Macedonian handball player for RK Alkaloid and the North Macedonia national team.

His brother Velko is also a handball player.

References

External links

1990 births
Living people
Macedonian male handball players
Sportspeople from Struga
Expatriate handball players
Macedonian expatriate sportspeople in Hungary
RK Vardar players